The 1967–68 West Midlands (Regional) League season was the 68th in the history of the West Midlands (Regional) League, an English association football competition for semi-professional and amateur teams based in the West Midlands county, Shropshire, Herefordshire, Worcestershire and southern Staffordshire.

Premier Division

The Premier Division featured 21 clubs which competed in the division last season, along with one new club:
Hinckley Athletic, relegated from the Southern Football League

League table

Division One

League table

References

External links

1967–68
W